Libošovice is a municipality and village in Jičín District in the Hradec Králové Region of the Czech Republic. It has about 500 inhabitants.

Administrative parts
Villages of Dobšice, Malá Lhota, Malechovice, Meziluží, Nepřívěc, Podkost, Rytířova Lhota and Vesec u Sobotky are administrative parts of Libošovice.

Sights

Libošovice is known for the Gothic Kost Castle, located above Podkost village, and for the Church of Saint Procopius in the centre of Libošovice.

References

Villages in Jičín District